Crim may refer to:

CRIM, the revenue service of the municipalities of Puerto Rico
 Crim (surname)
 Crim Festival of Races, a set of races including 'The Crim' held in August 
 A character from .Hack//Sign

See also

Crims, a British comedy television series
Krim (disambiguation)
Crime (disambiguation)
Criminal (disambiguation)